Upper Long Cane Cemetery is a historic cemetery in Abbeville, South Carolina, founded c. 1760.  Over 2,500 marked graves and numerous unmarked graves cover the cemetery's approximately 25 acres. It was listed on the National Register of Historic Places in 2010.

The cemetery helps document the history of many prominent families in the area, from its founding into the 20th century. Many gravestones were carved by three generations of master craftsmen from Charleston, including over fifty signed or attributable to stonecutters Rowe and White, John White, William T. White, Robert D. White, and Edwin R. White.

The markers include marble, granite, sandstone, and slate headstones, as well as footstones, obelisks, pedestal-tombs, box tombs, table-top tombs, and tablets. Art on the markers and tombs includes simple engraving and ledgers with motifs of angels, doves, lambs, open Bibles, weeping willows, palmettos, flowers, wreaths, and ivy.

Notable burials
 Maj. John Bowie (1740–1827), soldier in the American Revolution
 James Sproull Cothran (1830–1897), U.S. congressman
 Pvt. Ezekiel Evans (1737–1806), soldier in the American Revolution
 Pvt. James Evans (1761–1822), soldier in the American Revolution
 Lt. Gov. Eugene Blackburn Gary (1854–1926)
 Frank B. Gary (1860–1922), U.S. Senator
 Maj. Andrew Hamilton (1738–1835), officer in the American Revolution
 Samuel McGowan (1819–1897), Confederate general

References

Cemeteries on the National Register of Historic Places in South Carolina
Buildings and structures in Abbeville County, South Carolina
Tourist attractions in Abbeville County, South Carolina
National Register of Historic Places in Abbeville County, South Carolina